Karine Ruby (4 January 1978 in Bonneville, Haute-Savoie – 29 May 2009) was a French snowboarder and Olympic champion. She won two medals at the Winter Olympics, with a gold medal at the 1998 Winter Olympics in Nagano, and a silver medal at the 2002 Winter Olympics in Salt Lake City. She also earned six gold medals and four silver medals at the FIS Snowboard World Championships, and 67 wins and 122 podiums at the FIS Snowboard World Cup, which earned her the description by The New York Times as "the most decorated female snowboarder in the world".

Ruby won the giant slalom event in the snowboarding competition at the 1998 Winter Olympics held in Nagano, Japan, overcoming severe weather conditions to win the first Olympic gold medal awarded in the event to a woman. She finished a combined 1.74 seconds behind Isabelle Blanc in the parallel giant slalom in snowboarding competition at the 2002 Winter Olympics in Salt Lake City, an event that the two French snowboarders had dedicated to the memory of teammate Régine Cavagnoud, who had died in a 2001 training accident.

Ruby came in third place to win a bronze medal in snowboardcross at the Winter X Games IX held in Aspen, Colorado in January 2005.
She competed in the snowboardcross event at the 2006 Winter Olympics in Turin, Italy, and retired from the sport after being eliminated in the quarterfinals.

Ruby was training to become a mountain guide, a process that can take as long as 15 years, and was killed at age 31 on 29 May 2009 after a climbing accident in the Mont Blanc massif. One man was killed in the fall, while another sustained serious injuries and was hospitalized after being evacuated by helicopter.

References

External links
AP Obituary in The Times

1978 births
2009 deaths
People from Bonneville, Haute-Savoie
Mountaineering deaths
French female snowboarders
Olympic gold medalists for France
Olympic silver medalists for France
Olympic snowboarders of France
Snowboarders at the 1998 Winter Olympics
Snowboarders at the 2002 Winter Olympics
Snowboarders at the 2006 Winter Olympics
X Games athletes
Sport deaths in France
Olympic medalists in snowboarding
Medalists at the 2002 Winter Olympics
Medalists at the 1998 Winter Olympics
Université Savoie-Mont Blanc alumni
Sportspeople from Haute-Savoie
20th-century French women